
Gmina Wąchock is an urban-rural gmina (administrative district) in Starachowice County, Świętokrzyskie Voivodeship, in south-central Poland.

The gmina contains part of the protected area called Sieradowice Landscape Park.

Villages
Apart from the town of Wąchock, Gmina Wąchock contains the villages and settlements of Marcinków, Parszów, Rataje, Węglów and Wielka Wieś.

Neighbouring gminas
Gmina Wąchock is bordered by the towns of Skarżysko-Kamienna and Starachowice, and by the gminas of Bodzentyn, Brody, Mirzec, Pawłów, Skarżysko Kościelne and Suchedniów.

References
Polish official population figures 2006

Wachock
Starachowice County